The Church of Our Lady of Health is a Roman Catholic church in Kistanje, Croatia.

History 

The church was built in 1894.

It was dedicated in 1895 by Grgur Rajčević, archbishop of Zadar.

During the Croatian War of Independence it was devastated and robbed by Serbs.

In 1995 it was renovated.

Description 

The church has stone altar according to wall with wooden tabernacle and image of Our Lady of Health. It also have wooden altar with ambon according to people, with wooden statues of Saint Joseph and Virgin Mary with Child and gypsum statue of the Sacred Heart of Jesus.

The church also have stone baptistery and stone stoups.

See also 

 Church of Saint Nicholas, Kistanje

References 

Churches in Croatia
Buildings and structures in Šibenik-Knin County